Mimoeme lycoides is a species of beetle in the family Cerambycidae. It was described by Chemsak and Linsley in 1967.

References

Oemini
Beetles described in 1967